Eugène Plet (born 7 February 1952) is a French former professional racing cyclist. He rode in three editions of the Tour de France. His finished in tenth place on stage 8 of the 1977 Tour de France.

References

External links
 

1952 births
Living people
French male cyclists
Sportspeople from Mayenne
Cyclists from Pays de la Loire